Haiducii lui Șaptecai is a 1971 Romanian film directed by Dinu Cocea.

Cast
 Florin Piersic – Anghel Șaptecai
 Marga Barbu – Anita
 Colea Rautu – Mamulos
 Toma Caragiu – Răspopitul
  – Dudescu 
 Aimée Iacobescu – Ralu 
  – Phanariote 
 Constantin Codrescu – Iani 
  – Manolache Belivacă 
 Constantin Guriță – Duduveică 
 Ileana Buhoci-Gurgulescu – Fira (as Ileana Buhoci Gurgulescu) 
 Jean Constantin – Parpanghel
  – Sevastița
  – Caliopi (as Carmen Maria Struja) 
 Theo Partisch   
   
 Constantin Lungeanu   
  – Sultan's envoy
     
  – Raul
  – Găman
 Dorel Iacobescu
 Manea Enache
 
 Mihai Badiu
 Petre Gheorghiu-Dolj (as Petre Gheorghiu)
 Mircea Pascu
 Lucian Purdea

External links
 

1971 films
Romanian action films
Films directed by Dinu Cocea
1970s Romanian-language films